Data version control may refer to:
 Data version control, a method for managing different versions of data.
 Data Version Control (software), an open source system for versioning data.